Henan Township is a township under the administration of Hanyuan County in Sichuan, China. , it has four villages under its administration:
Henan Village
Yanjing Village
Pingdeng Village
Baishu Village

References 

Township-level divisions of Sichuan
Hanyuan County